In enzymology, a 4-chlorobenzoate—CoA ligase is an enzyme that catalyzes the chemical reaction

4-chlorobenzoate + CoA + ATP  4-chlorobenzoyl-CoA + AMP + diphosphate

The 3 substrates of this enzyme are 4-chlorobenzoate, CoA, and ATP, whereas its 3 products are 4-chlorobenzoyl-CoA, AMP, and diphosphate.

This enzyme belongs to the family of ligases, specifically those forming carbon-sulfur bonds as acid-thiol ligases.  The systematic name of this enzyme class is 4-chlorobenzoate:CoA ligase. This enzyme participates in 2,4-dichlorobenzoate degradation.  It employs one cofactor, magnesium.

Structural studies

References

 
 
 

EC 6.2.1
Magnesium enzymes
Enzymes of known structure